Ridgeway School may refer to:

 Ridgeway School, Kempston, a special school in Kempston, Bedfordshire, England
 The Ridgeway School & Sixth Form College, a secondary school in Wroughton, Wiltshire, England
 Ridgeway Secondary School, a secondary school in Astwood Bank, Worcestershire, England

See also
 Ridgeway (disambiguation)